Scotorythra goniastis is a moth of the family Geometridae first described by Edward Meyrick in 1899. It is endemic to the Hawaiian islands of Maui and Hawaii.

References

Further reading

G
Endemic moths of Hawaii
Biota of Maui